The Mason County, Kentucky slave pen played a very important role in the American slave trade, confining slaves who were intended to go farther south for sale.  This slave pen was recovered from a farm in Mason County, Kentucky, United States, which was owned by a slave trader named John W. Anderson, who played a significant part within the American domestic slave trade.  Anderson bought his farmstead in 1825, and after several years he and his family built a mansion and converted the old house into slave quarters.  In the early 1830s, he converted the slave quarters into a slave pen.

This slave pen has since been donated to the National Underground Railroad Freedom Center after being carefully taken apart and rebuilt by preservationists.  It addresses the participation of individuals and institutions in the slave trade and the serves as a major centerpiece in the Freedom Center, demonstrating the importance of the Midwest in the slavery system.

See also
History of slavery in Kentucky

External links
National Underground Railroad Freedom Center: Looking Back, Moving Forward  from AmericanCatholic.org

Buildings and structures in Mason County, Kentucky
Culture of Cincinnati
History of slavery in Kentucky
Slave cabins and quarters in the United States
Slave pens
Relocated buildings and structures in Ohio
Buildings and structures in Cincinnati